"Do the Handicapped Go to Hell?" is the ninth episode of the fourth season of the animated television series South Park, and 57th episode of the series overall.
Going by production order, it would be 10th episode of Season 4. "Do the Handicapped Go to Hell?" originally aired in the United States on July 19, 2000, on Comedy Central. It is the first part of a two-parter, which concludes in the following episode "Probably." The story links some of the events and characters of the film South Park: Bigger, Longer & Uncut into the animated series. The episode is rated TV-MA in the United States.

In the episode, the boys become obsessed with religion after a sermon about hell scares them. Meanwhile, Saddam returns to Hell and tries to dispose of Satan's new boyfriend.

Plot
Frightened into piety by Father Maxi's fire-and-brimstone sermon, Stan, Cartman, and Kenny begin to attend Sunday school classes with a nun named Sister Anne, who teaches them about Communion and confession. Issues arise when the children begin to ask questions regarding their classmates Kyle, who is Jewish, and Timmy, who is disabled and can say little more than his own name. The priest explains that both will go to Hell if they do not confess their sins. Later, in the confessional, Father Maxi tries to choke Cartman after he unwittingly confesses all the pranks he has played on the priest. Cartman tells the other kids that he has felt God's angry hand, which scares them even more.

Meanwhile, in Hell, Satan and the people of Hell sing The Hukilau Song (featuring Frank Sinatra, Dean Martin, Tiny Tim, Mao Zedong, Princess Diana, Adolf Hitler, among many others). Satan is torn between two lovers: Chris, an overly-sensitive man he is living with (voiced by Dian Bachar), and Saddam Hussein, Satan's emotionally-abusive ex whom he had killed at the end of South Park: Bigger, Longer & Uncut. Satan is surprised to see Saddam, though Saddam points out the obvious logic: "Yeah, you killed me. Where was I gonna go, Detroit?" It's apparent that Satan is still attracted to Saddam, and he struggles to choose between him and Chris. Chris invites Saddam over for dinner.

Back in South Park, the boys, frightened of dying without having confessed all their sins, are rushing to church when Kenny is hit by a bus. When they arrive at the church, they discover Father Maxi copulating with a woman in the confessional. A brunette woman with glasses runs away and shortly after Father Maxi is on his knees begging forgiveness then yells "Mrs. Donovan is a temptress from hell!" The boys, horrified at the priest's blatant sinfulness and hypocrisy, decide that they will have to save everyone themselves. The episode ends with Cartman using a bullhorn and a stereotypical, exaggerated Southern Protestant preacher's accent on a street corner, directing a large group of children to the creation of a new religious movement.

Reception
IGN rated the episode 9/10, stating "It's also one of the better religious satires the show has done." They comment that the funniest element is the love triangle between Satan, Saddam Hussein and Chris, and conclude that the episode is an example of "some of the most scathing commentary on social institutions there is."

References

External links

 "Do the Handicapped Go to Hell?" Full episode at South Park Studios
 

Fiction about the Devil
Television episodes about demons
Television episodes set in hell
South Park (season 4) episodes
Cultural depictions of Adolf Hitler
Cultural depictions of Frank Sinatra
Cultural depictions of Diana, Princess of Wales
Cultural depictions of Mao Zedong
Cultural depictions of Saddam Hussein
South Park episodes in multiple parts